CIWA may refer to:

 California Immigrant Workers Association
 Canadian Injured Workers Alliance
 Catholic Institute of West Africa
 Christmas Island Women's Association
 Clinical Institute Withdrawal Assessment for Alcohol